MV Kalama was a  operated by Washington State Ferries (WSF).  and Kalama were constructed in 1989 at Halter Marine in New Orleans, Louisiana.  Along with Skagit, she operated the Seattle-Vashon Island passenger-only service. In 2006 WSF was directed to end its passenger-only service, and in 2011 Kalama and Skagit were sold. The vessels were transported to Tanzania to provide service between the mainland and Zanzibar.

Kalama was ordered taken out of service by the Zanzibar government after the loss of Skagit in 2012.

References

 

Washington State Ferries vessels
1989 ships